Mofid University is a small college located in Qom, Iran.

Mofid University was founded by Abdolkarim Mousavi Ardebili, the former head of the Iranian judiciary, in 1989 as a private, non-profit institution. In the following years and due to the powerful support of Abdul-Karim Mousavi Ardebili, Mofid University has made some buildings Reformist in the college.

Mofid University has different buildings including a U-turn building. However, departments such as  Economics, Law, Philosophy, Political Science and English Language have also been established since 1988, 1992, 1993, 1994 and 2006 respectively. The university offers degrees in these departments at the B.A. and M.A. levels, as well as two Ph.D. degrees in these fields.

See also

Higher education in Iran

References

External links
 
 Qom University of Medical Science

Universities in Iran
Educational institutions established in 1989
Buildings and structures in Qom
Education in Qom Province
1989 establishments in Iran